The Sun-Shooting Tower or Chiayi Tower is a tower built inside Chiayi Park, East District, Chiayi City, Taiwan.

Architecture
The tower stands at a height of 62 meters. Its exterior designed was inspired by a giant sacred tree in Alishan. The brown aluminum pattern mimics the wood grain of the tree and the center is left with a  empty space that mimics the crack in the center of that giant sacred tree.

The interior bronze sculpture is inspired by the "Sun-Shooting" legend of Taiwanese indigenous peoples. This bronze-made sculpture is 24 meters tall and 3 meters wide.

The tower features an observation deck, a café and a small rooftop garden.

Transportation
The tower is accessible within walking distance southeast from Beimen Station of the Alishan Forest Railway or using Chiayi County Bus from Chiayi Station of Taiwan Railways Administration.

See also
 Kagi Shrine
 Chiayi Park

References

External links

 

1998 establishments in Taiwan
Buildings and structures in Chiayi
Tourist attractions in Chiayi
Towers completed in 1998
Towers in Taiwan